V27, or similar, may refer to
 Fokker V.27, a German World War I fighter aircraft
 V.27, a telecommunications recommendation of the ITU-T
 V27-225 kW, a wind turbine produced by Vestas